Earl Garrison was an Oklahoma Senator from District 9 between 2004 and 2016, which included Muskogee and Wagoner counties. He succeeded long-time State Senator "Bulldog" Ben Robinson of Muskogee after Senator Robinson was prevented from seeking reelection due to term limits.

Career
Garrison served in the Oklahoma Senate from 2004 to 2016. He was Minority Whip from 2011-2014. He also served as Assistant Minority Leader. He also worked as an educator and rancher. He served in the United States Air Force.

Family

Jessica Jean Garrison
In November 2021, Earl Garrison's daughter Jessica Jean Garrison announced a campaign for Oklahoma's United States Senate seat held by James Lankford. However, she later filed for the open United States Senate seat created by the retirement of Jim Inhofe.

References

External links
Senator Earl Garrison - District 9 official State Senate website
Project Vote Smart - Earl Garrison (OK) profile
Follow the Money - Earl Garrison
2008 2006 2004 campaign contributions

1941 births
Living people
Democratic Party Oklahoma state senators
Politicians from Muskogee, Oklahoma
21st-century American politicians